The Anglican Diocese of Awori is one of 13 within the Anglican Province of Lagos, itself one of 14 provinces within the Church of Nigeria. The current bishop is Johnson Akin Atere.

Notes

Dioceses of the Province of Lagos
 
Awori